Zhang Yanqing (Hepburn: Chō Enkei; 1898–1951), was a politician in the early Republic of China who subsequently collaborated with the Japanese imperialists and became the Foreign Minister of Manchukuo, Japan's puppet state. His father Zhang Zhidong was an important official in the later days of the Qing Empire, while his brother Zhang Renli was an official in the Reorganized National Government of China, another Japan's puppet state, making the two brothers as Japanese collaborators.

Biography
Zhang studied foreign languages at Tsingtao, and went to Japan to study at the Gakushuin Peer’s School in 1920. After his return to China in 1922, Zhang was appointed mayor of Wafangdian in Liaoning Province, and in 1924 was promoted to governor of Zhengding County in Hebei Province, and in 1925 was again promoted to governor of Tianjin under the Beiyang Government. In 1926, Tianjin was elevated to the status of a special province, and Zhang added the post of Chief of Police of Hebei Province to his list of positions. The following year,  he also became a councilor to the Transportation Ministry and Vice Chairman of the Defense Council of Kirin Province in Manchuria. In 1931, he moved to Changchun where he chaired the Economic Development Department of the government of Kirin Province.

Following the Mukden Incident in September 1931 and, Zhang assisted Xi Qia in issuing a proclamation declaring Kirin Province to be independent of the Republic of China, and assisted the Imperial Japanese Army achieve a bloodless occupation of Kirin City. After the proclamation of the State of Manchukuo he participated in the Manchukuo Senate, speaking out strongly in favor of a monarchy, and thus opposing proposals by Zang Shiyi that Manchukuo become a republic. In March 1932, he accepted the cabinet-level post of Industry Minister of the Empire of Manchukuo. He became one of the directors of the Concordia Association in July 1932. In May 1935, he replaced Xie Jishi as Foreign Minister, a post which he held until May 1937.

Following the collapse of Manchukuo, Zhang fled to Japan with the help of some associates of Mitsuru Toyama. He died in Japan in 1951 at the age of 54.

References

External links

Chinese site
Officials of Manchukuo (Japanese) 

Government ministers of Manchukuo
Politicians from Cangzhou
Republic of China warlords from Hebei
Chinese police officers
Chinese collaborators with Imperial Japan
1898 births
1951 deaths